Henry T. Johns (April 8, 1828 - May 13, 1906) was a Union Army soldier in the American Civil War who received the U.S. military's highest decoration, the Medal of Honor.

Johns was born in Philadelphia on April 8, 1828. He joined the 49th Massachusetts Infantry from Hinsdale, Massachusetts in September 1862, and mustered out with this regiment one year later. He was commissioned as an officer of the 61st Massachusetts Infantry in September 1864, and mustered out with this regiment in June 1865.

Johns was awarded the Medal of Honor, for extraordinary heroism on May 27, 1863, while serving as a Private with Company C, 49th Massachusetts Infantry Regiment, at Port Hudson, Louisiana. His Medal of Honor was issued on November 25, 1893. He died at the age of 78, on May 13, 1906, and was buried at the Mountain View Cemetery in Oakland, California.

Medal of Honor citation

References

External links

1828 births
1906 deaths
Burials in California
People of Pennsylvania in the American Civil War
Union Army soldiers
United States Army Medal of Honor recipients
American Civil War recipients of the Medal of Honor
People from Hinsdale, Massachusetts
Burials at Mountain View Cemetery (Oakland, California)